VfB Hüls is a German association football club from Marl, North Rhine-Westphalia.

History
The club was founded on 22 July 1948 as Eintracht Lippe and then renamed Verein für Rasenspiele 1948 e.V. Marl-Hüls on 27 January 1951. VfR merged with SuS Drewer-Süd in 1976 to create the current club. After claiming the title in the fifth division Verbandsliga Westfalen in 1997 the club was promoted to the Oberliga Westfalen (IV). In 2007 it was demoted to the Verbandsliga but won their division championship the next year to go back to the new NRW-Liga (V). In 2012 the NRW-Liga was dissolved and after four seasons there, 'VfR' was one of the clubs specially promoted to the Regionalliga West (IV) but was relegated after a 17th-place finish back to the refounded Oberliga Westfalen (V).  The club finished in 16th place in 2015 but announced its restart in the Bezirksliga (VIII) for next season.

Stadium
VfB Hüls plays its home matches in the Stadion am Badeweiher which has a capacity of 6,000.

Honours 
The club's honours:
 Oberliga Westfalen 
 Champions: 2000
 Westfalenliga – Group 1 
 Champions: 1990, 1994, 2008

References

External links 
 Official website 

 
Football clubs in Germany
Football clubs in North Rhine-Westphalia
Association football clubs established in 1948
Recklinghausen (district)
1948 establishments in Germany